Barney is a small crater on Mercury.  Its name was adopted by the International Astronomical Union (IAU) in 2013. Barney is named for the American-French playwright, poet, and novelist Natalie Clifford Barney.

Barney lies on the east side of the ancient Lennon-Picasso Basin.  About 137 km to the northeast of Barney is the highest point on Mercury (over 4 km above the global average), the highest part of scarps that are remnants of the rim of the Lennon-Picasso Basin.

References

Impact craters on Mercury